The Maserati Tipo 26B or Maserati Tipo 26B Monoposto was a racing car built by Italian manufacturer Maserati between 1927 and 1930, in a total of six examples and one additional engine.

It was closely derived from the Tipo 26 with the same steel ladder-type frame and a similar aluminum two-seater bodywork. The main difference was in the inline-eight engine being enlarged to 2 litres, otherwise it still featured a crankshaft-driven Roots supercharger, twin gear-driven overhead camshafts and dry sump lubrication. Two engines were rebored to 2.1 litres.

The Tipo 26B was conceived primarily for open road racing since its engine didn't comply with the 1926-1927 Grand Prix formula which required a maximum displacement of 1.5 litres.

At its debut race in the 1927 Targa Florio the Maserati Tipo 26B driven by Alfieri Maserati finished third overall.

A Tipo 26B was classified 12th in the 1930 Indianapolis 500 race, driven by Letterio Cucinotta of Messina.

Tipo 26B MM

For the 1928 Mille Miglia endurance race, a new chassis received the same treatment as the Tipo 26 MM being fitted with a roadster body. The coachwork featured cycle wings, running boards, doors, headlights, a small windshield, a folding canvas top and two spare wheels mounted on the tail. Under the hood the engine was the same as found in the Tipo 26B. Three other chassis were built between 1929 and 1930. Those cars were known as Tipo 26B MM.

References

Tipo 26
Grand Prix cars